Dirty Disco may refer to:

Dirty Disco (duo), Mark De Lange and JD Arnold
Dirty Disco Youth, a project of Phil Speiser